Mario Raggi (1821–26 November 1907) was an Italian sculptor who settled in England where he received several public commissions for statues of civic figures.

Biography
Raggi was born at Carrara, Italy where he learnt to sculpt, and won several prizes, at the local Accademia di Belle Arti di Carrara. He continued his training in Rome under Pietro Tenerani before moving to London in 1850 where he first worked for Raffaelle Monti and then, for several years, for Matthew Noble. In 1875 Raggi established his own studio in London.

Raggi was given some major commissions including memorials to Benjamin Disraeli at Parliament Square and Gladstone for Albert Square, Manchester. He completed three monumental statues of Queen Victoria for Hong Kong, Toronto and Kimberley in South Africa. A bronze statue by Raggi of Henry Vivian, 1st Baron Swansea wearing a frock coat and gown stands  in Swansea city centre. Raggi first exhibited a work, Innocence at the Royal Academy in 1854 but did not show there again until 1878 when he exhibited a portrait bust of Admiral Rous. He continued to exhibit portrait busts at the Academy until 1895.

Raggi is buried at West Norwood Cemetery, where his memorial is a flat slab.

Selected works

References

External links

 

1821 births
1907 deaths
19th-century Italian male artists
19th-century Italian sculptors
Burials at West Norwood Cemetery
Italian emigrants to the United Kingdom
Italian male sculptors
People from Carrara